Samatra TV tower, is a television and radio broadcasting tower located near Samatra village,  west of Bhuj in Kutch district, Gujarat, India. It was completed in 1999.

References

Bhuj
Communication towers in India
Towers completed in 1999
1999 establishments in Gujarat
Buildings and structures in Gujarat
20th-century architecture in India